The 1999 Tour Down Under was the first edition of the Tour Down Under stage race. It took place from 19 to 24 January in and around Adelaide, South Australia.

Participating teams

 Arfil
 Australian Institute of Sports
 Sun-Smart World Team

Route and stages

Final classification

References

Tour Down Under
Tour Down Under, 1999
Tour Down Under, 1999
1999 in Oceanian sport
Tour